The Tampa Bay Rays 2012 season was the team's 15th season of baseball, and the fifth as the "Rays" (all at Tropicana Field). The Rays hoped to improve on their 91–71 record from 2011 and make the postseason for a franchise record third straight season. They finished the season 90–72, third place in the AL East, and third place in the AL Wild Card, missing the postseason for the first time since 2009.

Offseason
On November 27, 2011, the Rays traded catcher John Jaso to the Seattle Mariners for relief pitcher Josh Lueke, as well as a player to be named later or cash.

The Rays signed catcher José Molina on November 28, 2011 to a one-year, $1.5 million contract with a $1.5 million club option for 2013, with a $300,000 buyout.

On December 13, 2011, the Rays acquired relief pitcher Burke Badenhop from the Miami Marlins in exchange for minor league catcher Jake Jefferies. At midnight that night, Badenhop was one of six arbitration eligible players that were tendered by the Rays, along with outfielder B. J. Upton, starting pitchers Jeff Niemann and David Price, and relief pitchers J. P. Howell and Joel Peralta. Not tendered was relief pitcher and former starting pitcher for the Rays, Andy Sonnanstine.

Relief pitcher Fernando Rodney was signed on January 5 to a one-year contract worth $1.75 million. The deal included a team option for 2013 worth $2.5 million or a $250,000 buyout. In 2009, while playing for the Detroit Tigers, Rodney made news at Tropicana Field when he threw a baseball into the stadium's press box from the field after converting a save. He was suspended for three games following the incident. After being signed by the Rays, he apologized for his actions.

On January 11, the Rays signed Luke Scott to a one-year contract with an option for 2013. He is expected to be the team's designated hitter primarily, though he could also be used at first base.

On January 20, the Rays signed Carlos Peña, bringing him back to the Rays for the 2012 season after just one season away with the Cubs. The contract is worth a year at $7.25 million. He is expected to be the everyday first baseman, as he was in his previous stint from 2007–2010. Outfielder Justin Ruggiano was designated for assignment on January 24 to make room on the 40-man roster.

The Rays announced on February 15 that manager Joe Maddon was given a 3-year contract extension worth $6 million, which would last through the 2015 season.

Season standings

American League East

American League Wild Card

Record vs. opponents

Regular season

|-  style="text-align:center; bgcolor="bbffbb"
| 1 || April 6 || Yankees || 7–6 || Rodney (1–0) || Rivera (0–1) || || 34,078 || 1–0 || 
|-  style="text-align:center; bgcolor="bbffbb"
| 2 || April 7 || Yankees || 8–6 || Price (1–0) || Kuroda (0–1) || Rodney (1) || 34,078 || 2–0 || 
|-  style="text-align:center; bgcolor="bbffbb"
| 3 || April 8 || Yankees || 3–0 || Hellickson (1–0) || Hughes (0–1) || Rodney (2) || 30,413 || 3–0 || 
|- style="text-align:center;" bgcolor="ffbbbb"
| 4 || April 10 || @ Tigers || 2–5 || Coke (1–0) || McGee (0–1) || Valverde (1) || 22,574 || 3–1 || 
|- style="text-align:center;" bgcolor="bbffbb"
| 5 || April 11 || @ Tigers || 4–2 || Shields (1–0) || Verlander (0–1) || Rodney (3) || 28,180 || 4–1 || 
|- style="text-align:center;" bgcolor="ffbbbb"
| 6 || April 12 || @ Tigers || 2–7 || Balester (1–0) || Niemann (0–1) || || 30,288 || 4–2 || 
|- style="text-align:center;" bgcolor="ffbbbb"
| 7 || April 13 || @ Red Sox || 2–12 || Beckett (1–1) || Price (1–1) || || 37,032 || 4–3 || 
|- style="text-align:center;" bgcolor="ffbbbb"
| 8 || April 14 || @ Red Sox || 5–13 || Buchholz (1–0) || Badenhop (0–1) || || 38,024 || 4–4 || 
|- style="text-align:center;" bgcolor="ffbbbb"
| 9 || April 15 || @ Red Sox || 4–6 || Padilla (1–0) || Moore (0–1) || Aceves (2) || 38,024 || 4–5 || 
|- style="text-align:center;" bgcolor="bbffbb"
| 10 || April 16 || @ Red Sox || 1–0 || Shields (2–0) || Bard (0–2) || Rodney (4) || 38,108 || 5–5 || 
|- style="text-align:center;" bgcolor="ffbbbb"
| 11 || April 17 || @ Blue Jays || 3–7 || Romero (2–0) || Niemann (0–2) || || 15,331 || 5–6 || 
|- style="text-align:center;" bgcolor="bbffbb"
| 12 || April 18 || @ Blue Jays || 12–2 || Price (2–1) || Morrow (0–1) || || 15,828 || 6–6 || 
|- style="text-align:center;" bgcolor="bbffbb"
| 13 || April 19 || @ Blue Jays || 9–4 || Hellickson (2–0) || Álvarez (0–1) || || 18,976 || 7–6 || 
|- style="text-align:center;" bgcolor="ffbbbb"
| 14 || April 20 || Twins || 4–5 || Maloney (1–0) || Gomes (0–1) || Capps (4) || 18,763 || 7–7 || 
|- style="text-align:center;" bgcolor="bbffbb"
| 15 || April 21 || Twins || 4–1 || Shields (3–0) || Pavano (1–2) || Rodney (5) || 31,774 || 8–7 || 
|- style="text-align:center;" bgcolor="bbffbb"
| 16 || April 22 || Twins || 6–2 || Niemann (1–2) || Liriano (0–3) || || 26,507 || 9–7 || 
|- style="text-align:center;" bgcolor="bbffbb"
| 17 || April 24 || Angels || 5–0 || Price (3–1) || Santana (0–4) || || 14,933 || 10–7 || 
|- style="text-align:center;" bgcolor="bbffbb"
| 18 || April 25 || Angels || 3–2 || Hellickson (3–0) || Wilson (2–2) || Rodney (6) || 14,638 || 11–7 || 
|- style="text-align:center;" bgcolor="bbffbb"
| 19 || April 26 || Angels || 4–3 || Gomes (1–1) || Walden (0–1) || || 15,417 || 12–7 || 
|- style="text-align:center;" bgcolor="bbffbb"
| 20 || April 27 || @ Rangers || 8–4 || Shields (4–0) || Harrison (3–1) || || 47,496 || 13–7 || 
|- style="text-align:center;" bgcolor="ffbbbb"
| 21 || April 28 || @ Rangers || 2–7 || Lewis (3–0) || Niemann (1–3) || || 49,197 || 13–8 || 
|- style="text-align:center;" bgcolor="bbffbb"
| 22 || April 29 || @ Rangers || 5–2 || Price (4–1) || Holland (2–2) || Rodney (7) || 43,475 || 14–8 || 
|- style="text-align:center;" bgcolor="bbffbb"
| 23 || April 30 || Mariners || 3–2 (12) || Howell (1–0) || League (0–2) || || 9,458 || 15–8 || 
|-

|- style="text-align:center;" bgcolor="bbffbb"  
| 24 || May 1 || Mariners || 3–1 || Moore (1–1) || Noesí (1–3) || Rodney (8) || 9,972 || 16–8 || 
|- style="text-align:center;" bgcolor="bbffbb"
| 25 || May 2 || Mariners || 5–4 || Shields (5–0) || Beavan (1–3) || Peralta (1) || 9,837 || 17–8 || 
|- style="text-align:center;" bgcolor="bbffbb" 
| 26 || May 3 || Mariners || 4–3 || Niemann (2–3) || Millwood (0–3) || Rodney (9) || 11,575 || 18–8 || 
|- style="text-align:center;" bgcolor="bbffbb"
| 27 || May 4 || Athletics || 7–2 || Price (5–1) || Ross (1–2) || Peralta (2) || 18,799 || 19–8 || 
|- style="text-align:center;" bgcolor="ffbbbb"
| 28 || May 5 || Athletics || 3–4 (12) || Fuentes (2–0) || Peralta (0–1) || Balfour (7) || 23,890 || 19–9 || 
|- style="text-align:center;" bgcolor="ffbbbb"
| 29 || May 6 || Athletics || 5–9 || Milone (4–2) || Moore (1–2) || || 23,873 || 19–10 || 
|- style="text-align:center;" bgcolor="ffbbbb"
| 30 || May 8 || @ Yankees || 3–5 || Nova (4–1) || Shields (5–1) || Robertson (1) || 37,086 || 19–11 || 
|- style="text-align:center;" bgcolor="bbffbb" 
| 31 || May 9 || @ Yankees || 4–1 || Rodney (2–0) || Robertson (0–1) || || 38,024 || 20–11 || 
|- style="text-align:center;" bgcolor="ffbbbb"
| 32 || May 10 || @ Yankees || 3–5 || Sabathia (5–0) || Price (5–2) || Soriano (1) || 37,720 || 20–12 || 
|- style="text-align:center;" bgcolor="ffbbbb"
| 33 || May 11 || @ Orioles || 3–4 || O'Day (3–0) || Peralta (0–2) || Johnson (10) || 26,669 || 20–13 || 
|- style="text-align:center;" bgcolor="ffbbbb"
| 34 || May 12 || @ Orioles || 3–5 || Matusz (2–4) || Moore (1–3) || Johnson (11) || 32,862 || 20–14 || 
|- style="text-align:center;" bgcolor="bbffbb"
| 35 || May 13 || @ Orioles || 9–8 || Shields (6–1) || Arrieta (2–4) || Rodney (10) || 29,552 || 21–14 || 
|- style="text-align:center;" bgcolor="bbffbb"
| 36 || May 14 || @ Blue Jays || 7–1 || Ramos (1–0) || Morrow (4–2) || || 15,289 || 22–14 || 
|- style="text-align:center;" bgcolor="bbffbb"
| 37 || May 15 || @ Blue Jays || 4–3 || Price (6–2) || Álvarez (3–3) || Rodney (11) || 15,612 || 23–14 || 
|- style="text-align:center;" bgcolor="bbffbb"
| 38 || May 16 || Red Sox || 2–1 || Hellickson (4–0) || Buchholz (4–2) || Rodney (12) || 20,843 || 24–14 || 
|- style="text-align:center;" bgcolor="ffbbbb"
| 39 || May 17 || Red Sox || 3–5 || Doubront (4–1) || Moore (1–4) || Aceves (8) || 19,842 || 24–15 || 
|- style="text-align:center;" bgcolor="ffbbbb"
| 40 || May 18 || Braves || 3–5 || Hanson (5–3) || Shields (6–2) || Kimbrel (12) || 19,693 || 24–16 || 
|- style="text-align:center;" bgcolor="bbffbb"
| 41 || May 19 || Braves || 5–2 || Cobb (1–0) || Delgado (2–4) || Rodney (13) || 27,433 || 25–16 || 
|- style="text-align:center;" bgcolor="ffbbbb"
| 42 || May 20 || Braves || 0–2 || Hudson (3–1) || Price (6–3) || Kimbrel (13) || 24,759 || 25–17 || 
|- style="text-align:center;" bgcolor="ffbbbb"
| 43 || May 21 || Blue Jays || 2–6 || Drabek (4–4) || Hellickson (4–1) || || 10,844 || 25–18 || 
|- style="text-align:center;" bgcolor="bbffbb"
| 44 || May 22 || Blue Jays || 8–5 || Davis (1–0) || Hutchison (3–2) || Rodney (14) || 12,307 || 26–18 || 
|- style="text-align:center;" bgcolor="bbffbb"
| 45 || May 23 || Blue Jays || 5–4 (11) || McGee (1–1) || Oliver (0–2) || || 11,471 || 27–18 || 
|- style="text-align:center;" bgcolor="bbffbb"
| 46 || May 25 || @ Red Sox || 7–4 || Cobb (2–0) || Lester (3–4) || Rodney (15) || 37,594 || 28–18 || 
|- style="text-align:center;" bgcolor="ffbbbb"
| 47 || May 26 || @ Red Sox || 2–3 || Hill (1–0) || Rodney (2–1) || || 38,099 || 28–19 || 
|- style="text-align:center;" bgcolor="bbffbb"
| 48 || May 27 || @ Red Sox || 4–3 || McGee (2–1) || Aceves (0–2) || Rodney (16) || 37,844 || 29–19 || 
|- style="text-align:center;" bgcolor="ffbbbb"
| 49 || May 28 || White Sox || 1–2 || Sale (6–2) || Moore (1–5) || Reed (5) || 22,227 || 29–20 || 
|- style="text-align:center;" bgcolor="ffbbbb"
| 50 || May 29 || White Sox || 2–7 || Humber (2–2) || Shields (6–3) || || 13,735 || 29–21 || 
|- style="text-align:center;" bgcolor="ffbbbb"
| 51 || May 30 || White Sox || 3–4 || Jones (3–0) || Cobb (2–1) || Reed (6) || 13,369 || 29–22 || 
|-

|- style="text-align:center;" bgcolor="bbffbb"
| 52 || June 1 || Orioles || 5–0 || Price (7–3) || Chen (4–2) || Rodney (17) || 17,224 || 30–22 || 
|- style="text-align:center;" bgcolor="ffbbbb"
| 53 || June 2 || Orioles || 1–2 || Matusz (5–5) || Hellickson (4–2) || Johnson (17) || 21,693 || 30–23 || 
|- style="text-align:center;" bgcolor="bbffbb"
| 54 || June 3 || Orioles || 8–4 || Moore (2–5) || Arrieta (2–7) || || 21,693 || 31–23 || 
|- style="text-align:center;" bgcolor="ffbbbb"
| 55 || June 5 || @ Yankees || 0–7 || Pettitte (3–2) || Shields (6–4) || || 40,537 || 31–24 || 
|- style="text-align:center;" bgcolor="ffbbbb"
| 56 || June 6 || @ Yankees || 1–4 || Nova (7–2) || Cobb (2–2) || Soriano (8) || 38,370 || 31–25 || 
|- style="text-align:center;" bgcolor="bbffbb"
| 57 || June 7 || @ Yankees || 7–3 || Price (8–3) || Sabathia (7–3) || || 39,891 || 32–25 || 
|- style="text-align:center;" bgcolor="bbffbb"
| 58 || June 8 || @ Marlins || 5–1 || Badenhop (1–1) || Nolasco (6–4) || || 29,628 || 33–25 || 
|- style="text-align:center;" bgcolor="bbffbb"
| 59 || June 9 || @ Marlins || 13–4 || Moore (3–5) || Zambrano (4–4) || || 30,963 || 34–25 || 
|- style="text-align:center;" bgcolor="bbffbb"
| 60 || June 10 || @ Marlins || 4–2 || Shields (7–4) || Sánchez (3–5) || Rodney (18) || 31,111 || 35–25 || 
|- style="text-align:center;" bgcolor="ffbbbb"
| 61 || June 12 || Mets || 2–11 || Young (1–0) || Cobb (2–3) || || 17,334 || 35–26 || 
|- style="text-align:center;" bgcolor="ffbbbb"
| 62 || June 13 || Mets || 1–9 || Dickey (10–1) || Price (8–4) || || 18,496 || 35–27 || 
|- style="text-align:center;" bgcolor="ffbbbb"
| 63 || June 14 || Mets || 6–9 || Santana (4–3) || Hellickson (4–3) || Francisco (16) || 21,947 || 35–28 || 
|- style="text-align:center;" bgcolor="bbffbb"
| 64 || June 15 || Marlins || 11–0 || Moore (4–5) || Zambrano (4–5) || || 18,369 || 36–28 || 
|- style="text-align:center;" bgcolor="ffbbbb"
| 65 || June 16 || Marlins || 3–4 (15) || Webb (3–1) || Gomes (1–2) || Bell (14) || 22,332 || 36–29 || 
|- style="text-align:center;" bgcolor="bbffbb"
| 66 || June 17 || Marlins || 3–0 || Cobb (3–3) || Johnson (4–5) || Rodney (19) || 33,810 || 37–29 || 
|- style="text-align:center;" bgcolor="bbffbb"
| 67 || June 19 || @ Nationals || 5–4 || Price (9–4) || Wang (2–3) || Rodney (20) || 27,835 || 38–29 || 
|- style="text-align:center;" bgcolor="ffbbbb"
| 68 || June 20 || @ Nationals || 2–3 || Strasburg (9–1) || Archer (0–1) || Clippard (10) || 27,485 || 38–30 || 
|- style="text-align:center;" bgcolor="ffbbbb"
| 69 || June 21 || @ Nationals || 2–5 || Gonzalez (9–3) || Peralta (0–3) || Clippard (11) || 29,551 || 38–31 || 
|- style="text-align:center;" bgcolor="bbbbbb"
| — || June 22 || @ Phillies || colspan=7|Postponed (rain); Makeup: June 24
|- style="text-align:center;" bgcolor="ffbbbb"
| 70 || June 23 || @ Phillies || 6–7 || Papelbon (2–2) || McGee (2–2) || || 44,878 || 38–32 || 
|- style="text-align:center;" bgcolor="bbffbb"
| 71 || June 24  || @ Phillies || 3–2 || Price (10–4) || Bastardo (2–2) || Rodney (21) || 44,785 || 39–32 || 
|- style="text-align:center;" bgcolor="bbffbb"
| 72 || June 24  || @ Phillies || 7–3 || Gomes (2–2) || Lee (0–4) || || 44,088 || 40–32 || 
|- style="text-align:center;" bgcolor="ffbbbb"
| 73 || June 25 || @ Royals || 0–8 || Hochevar (5–7) || Cobb (3–4) || || 20,200 || 40–33 || 
|- style="text-align:center;" bgcolor="ffbbbb"
| 74 || June 26 || @ Royals || 2–8 || Chen (7–6) || Archer (0–2) || || 25,982 || 40–34 || 
|- style="text-align:center;" bgcolor="ffbbbb"
| 75 || June 27 || @ Royals || 4–5 || Crow (1–1) || Badenhop (1–2) || Broxton (19) || 19,228 || 40–35 || 
|- style="text-align:center;" bgcolor="ffbbbb"
| 76 || June 28 || Tigers || 2–5 || Scherzer (7–5) || Shields (7–5) || Valverde (14) || 20,532 || 40–36 || 
|- style="text-align:center;" bgcolor="bbffbb"
| 77 || June 29 || Tigers || 4–2 || Price (11–4) || Verlander (8–5) || Rodney (22) || 19,557 || 41–36 || 
|- style="text-align:center;" bgcolor="ffbbbb"
| 78 || June 30 || Tigers || 2–6 || Porcello (6–5) || Hellickson (4–4) || || 29,443 || 41–37 || 
|-

|- style="text-align:center;" bgcolor="ffbbbb"
| 79 || July 1 || Tigers || 3–5 || Smyly (3–3) || Cobb (3–5) || Valverde (15) || 21,874 || 41–38 || 
|- style="text-align:center;" bgcolor="bbffbb"
| 80 || July 2 || Yankees || 4–3 || Moore (5–5) || Robertson (0–3) || Rodney (23) || 21,742 || 42–38 || 
|- style="text-align:center;" bgcolor="bbffbb"
| 81 || July 3 || Yankees || 7–4 || Shields (8–5) || Nova (9–3) || Rodney (24) || 26,453 || 43–38 || 
|- style="text-align:center;" bgcolor="ffbbbb"
| 82 || July 4 || Yankees || 3–4 || Logan (3–0) || Farnsworth (0–1) || Soriano (19) || 28,033 || 43–39 || 
|- style="text-align:center;" bgcolor="ffbbbb"
| 83 || July 5 || @ Indians || 1–3 || Tomlin (5–5) || Hellickson (4–5) || Perez (24) || 26,577 || 43–40 || 
|- style="text-align:center;" bgcolor="bbffbb"
| 84 || July 6 || @ Indians || 10–3 || Cobb (4–5) || Masterson (5–8) || || 28,734 || 44–40 || 
|- style="text-align:center;" bgcolor="ffbbbb"
| 85 || July 7 || @ Indians || 3–7 || Jiménez (8–7) || Moore (5–6) || || 20,658 || 44–41 || 
|- style="text-align:center;"  bgcolor="bbffbb"
| 86 || July 8 || @ Indians || 7–6 || Peralta (1–3) || Perez (0–2) || Rodney (25) || 19,163 || 45–41 || 
|- style="text-align:center;"
| colspan="10" style="background:#bbcaff;"|All-Star Break
|- style="text-align:center;" bgcolor="ffbbbb"
| 87 || July 13 || Red Sox || 1–3 || Morales (2–2) || Hellickson (4–6) || Aceves (20) || 29,089 || 45–42 || 
|- style="text-align:center;" bgcolor="bbffbb"
| 88 || July 14 || Red Sox || 5–3 || Price (12–4) || Buchholz (8–3) || Rodney (26) || 27,311 || 46–42 || 
|- style="text-align:center;" bgcolor="ffbbbb"
| 89 || July 15 || Red Sox || 3–7 || Beckett (5–7) || Shields (8–6) || || 26,131 || 46–43 || 
|- style="text-align:center;" bgcolor="ffbbbb"
| 90 || July 16 || Indians || 2–3 || McAllister (4–1) || Cobb (4–6) || Perez (26) || 14,337 || 46–44 || 
|- style="text-align:center;" bgcolor="bbffbb"
| 91 || July 17 || Indians || 4–2 || Moore (6–6) || Tomlin (5–6) || Rodney (27) || 15,712 || 47–44 || 
|- style="text-align:center;" bgcolor="ffbbbb"
| 92 || July 18 || Indians || 6–10 || Rogers (1–2) || Farnsworth (0–2) || || 15,143 || 47–45 || 
|- style="text-align:center;" bgcolor="bbffbb"
| 93 || July 19 || Indians || 6–0 || Price (13–4) || Jiménez (8–9) || || 27,856 || 48–45 || 
|- style="text-align:center;" bgcolor="bbffbb"
| 94 || July 20 || Mariners || 4–3 (14) || McGee (3–2) || Wilhelmsen (3–2) || || 14,143 || 49–45 || 
|- style="text-align:center;" bgcolor="ffbbbb"
| 95 || July 21 || Mariners || 1–2 || Vargas (10–7) || Cobb (4–7) || Wilhelmsen (9) || 18,800 || 49–46 || 
|- style="text-align:center;" bgcolor="ffbbbb"
| 96 || July 22 || Mariners || 1–2 || Beavan (5–6) || Moore (6–7) || Wilhelmsen (10) || 20,908 || 49–47 || 
|- style="text-align:center;" bgcolor="bbffbb"
| 97 || July 24 || @ Orioles || 3–1 || Hellickson (5–6) || Chen (8–6) || Rodney (28) || 17,592 || 50–47 || 
|- style="text-align:center;" bgcolor="bbffbb"
| 98 || July 25 || @ Orioles || 10–1 || Price (14–4) || González (2–2) || || 19,582 || 51–47 || 
|- style="text-align:center;" bgcolor="ffbbbb"
| 99 || July 26 || @ Orioles || 2–6 || Tillman (3–1) || Shields (8–7) || || 21,301 || 51–48 || 
|- style="text-align:center;" bgcolor="ffbbbb"
| 100 || July 27 || @ Angels || 1–3 || Haren (8–8) || Cobb (4–8) || Frieri (12) || 40,136 || 51–49 || 
|- style="text-align:center;" bgcolor="bbffbb"
| 101 || July 28 || @ Angels || 3–0 || Moore (7–7) || Wilson (9–7) || Rodney (29) || 41,232 || 52–49 || 
|- style="text-align:center;" bgcolor="bbffbb"
| 102 || July 29 || @ Angels || 2–0 || Hellickson (6–6) || Greinke (9–4) || Rodney (30) || 35,477 || 53–49 || 
|- style="text-align:center;" bgcolor="ffbbbb"
| 103 || July 30 || @ Athletics || 3–4 (15) || Norberto (3–1) || Farnsworth (0–3) || || 12,564 || 53–50 || 
|- style="text-align:center;" bgcolor="bbffbb"
| 104 || July 31 || @ Athletics || 8–0 || Shields (9–7) || Milone (9–8) || || 15,836 || 54–50 || 
|-

|- style="text-align:center;" bgcolor="bbffbb"
| 105 || August 1 || @ Athletics || 4–1 || Cobb (5–8) || Parker (7–5) || Rodney (31) || 18,161 || 55–50 || 
|- style="text-align:center;" bgcolor="bbffbb"
| 106 || August 3 || Orioles || 2–0 || Moore (8–7) || Hunter (4–7) || Rodney (32) || 18,410 || 56–50 || 
|- style="text-align:center;" bgcolor="ffbbbb"
| 107 || August 4 || Orioles || 0–4 || Chen (10–6) || Hellickson (6–7) || || 20,612 || 56–51 || 
|- style="text-align:center;" bgcolor="ffbbbb"
| 108 || August 5 || Orioles || 0–1 (10) || Ayala (3–3) || Peralta (1–4) || Johnson (32) || 29,530 || 56–52 || 
|- style="text-align:center;" bgcolor="bbffbb"
| 109 || August 7 || Blue Jays || 4–1 || Shields (10–7) || Happ (7–10) || Rodney (33) || 13,823 || 57–52 || 
|- style="text-align:center;" bgcolor="bbffbb"
| 110 || August 8 || Blue Jays || 3–2 || Cobb (6–8) || Villanueva (6–2) || Rodney (34) || 13,441 || 58–52 || 
|- style="text-align:center;" bgcolor="bbffbb"
| 111 || August 9 || Blue Jays || 7–1 || Moore (9–7) || Álvarez (7–9) || || 23,462 || 59–52 || 
|- style="text-align:center;" bgcolor="bbffbb"
| 112 || August 10 || @ Twins || 12–6 || Hellickson (7–7) || De Vries (2–3) || || 38,108 || 60–52 || 
|- style="text-align:center;" bgcolor="bbffbb"
| 113 || August 11 || @ Twins || 4–2 || Price (15–4) || Blackburn (4–8) || Rodney (35) || 39,512 || 61–52 || 
|- style="text-align:center;" bgcolor="bbffbb"
| 114 || August 12 || @ Twins || 7–3 (10) || Farnsworth (1–3) || Burnett (4–4) || Rodney (36) || 35,327 || 62–52 || 
|- style="text-align:center;" bgcolor="bbffbb"
| 115 || August 13 || @ Mariners || 4–1 || Cobb (7–8) || Beavan (7–7) || Rodney (37) || 16,205 || 63–52 || 
|- style="text-align:center;" bgcolor="ffbbbb"
| 116 || August 14 || @ Mariners || 2–3 || Pryor (2–0) || Rodney (2–2) || || 17,065 || 63–53 || 
|- style="text-align:center;" bgcolor="ffbbbb"
| 117 || August 15 || @ Mariners || 0–1 || Hernández (11–5) || Hellickson (7–8) || || 21,889 || 63–54 || 
|- style="text-align:center;" bgcolor="bbffbb"
| 118 || August 16 || @ Angels || 7–0 || Price (16–4) || Haren (8–10) || || 38,591 || 64–54 || 
|- style="text-align:center;" bgcolor="bbffbb"
| 119 || August 17 || @ Angels || 12–3 || Shields (11–7) || Weaver (15–3) || || 37,298 || 65–54 || 
|- style="text-align:center;" bgcolor="bbffbb"
| 120 || August 18 || @ Angels || 10–8 || McGee (4–2) || Jepsen (2–2) || Rodney (38) || 41,086 || 66–54 || 
|- style="text-align:center;" bgcolor="bbffbb"
| 121 || August 19 || @ Angels || 8–3 || Moore (10–7) || Greinke (10–5) || || 36,789 || 67–54 || 
|- style="text-align:center;" bgcolor="bbffbb"
| 122 || August 20 || Royals || 5–1 || Hellickson (8–8) || Smith (4–5) || || 9,913 || 68–54 || 
|- style="text-align:center;" bgcolor="ffbbbb"
| 123 || August 21 || Royals || 0–1 (10) || Herrera (1–1) || Peralta (1–5) || Holland (6) || 10,877 || 68–55 || 
|- style="text-align:center;" bgcolor="bbffbb"
| 124 || August 22 || Royals || 5–3 || Shields (12–7) || Mendoza (7–9) || Rodney (39) || 11,892 || 69–55 || 
|- style="text-align:center;" bgcolor="bbffbb"
| 125 || August 23 || Athletics || 5–0 || Cobb (8–8) || Ross (2–9) || || 11,613 || 70–55 || 
|- style="text-align:center;" bgcolor="ffbbbb"
| 126 || August 24 || Athletics || 4–5 || Cook (6–2) || Peralta (1–6) || Balfour (13) || 18,913 || 70–56 || 
|- style="text-align:center;" bgcolor="ffbbbb"
| 127 || August 25 || Athletics || 2–4 || McCarthy (7–5) || Hellickson (8–9) || Balfour (14) || 18,187 || 70–57 || 
|- style="text-align:center;" bgcolor="ffbbbb"
| 128 || August 27 || @ Rangers || 5–6 || Holland (9–6) || Price (16–5) || Nathan (26) || 29,453 || 70–58 || 
|- style="text-align:center;" bgcolor="ffbbbb"
| 129 || August 28 || @ Rangers || 0–1 || Darvish (13–9) || Shields (12–8) || Nathan (27) || 30,700 || 70–59 || 
|- style="text-align:center;" bgcolor="bbffbb"
| 130 || August 29 || @ Rangers || 8–4 || McGee (5–2) || Harrison (15–8) || || 36,176 || 71–59 || 
|- style="text-align:center;" bgcolor="ffbbbb"
| 131 || August 30 || @ Blue Jays || 0–2 || Villanueva (7–4) || Moore (10–8) || Janssen (18) || 22,711 || 71–60 || 
|- style="text-align:center;" bgcolor="ffbbbb"
| 132 || August 31 || @ Blue Jays || 1–2 || Morrow (8–5) || Hellickson (8–10) || Janssen (19) || 20,158 || 71–61 || 
|-

|- style="text-align:center;" bgcolor="bbffbb"
| 133 || September 1 || @ Blue Jays || 5–4 || Davis (2–0) || Álvarez (7–12) || Rodney (40) || 20,478 || 72–61 || 
|- style="text-align:center;" bgcolor="bbffbb"
| 134 || September 2 || @ Blue Jays || 9–4 || Price (17–5) || Romero (8–13) || || 18,568 || 73–61 || 
|- style="text-align:center;" bgcolor="bbffbb"
| 135 || September 3 || Yankees || 4–3 || Shields (13–8) || Robertson (1–5) || Rodney (41) || 28,585 || 74–61 || 
|- style="text-align:center;" bgcolor="bbffbb"
| 136 || September 4 || Yankees || 5–2 || Cobb (9–8) || García (7–6) || Rodney (42) || 17,652 || 75–61 || 
|- style="text-align:center;" bgcolor="ffbbbb"
| 137 || September 5 || Yankees || 4–6 || Kuroda (13–10) || Moore (10–9) || Soriano (36) || 16,711 || 75–62 || 
|- style="text-align:center;" bgcolor="bbffbb"
| 138 || September 7 || Rangers || 3–1 (11) || Davis (3–0) || Lowe (0–1) ||  || 19,545 || 76–62 || 
|- style="text-align:center;" bgcolor="ffbbbb"
| 139 || September 8 || Rangers || 2–4 (10) || Adams (5–3) || Farnsworth (1–4) || Nathan (31) || 18,702 || 76–63 || 
|- style="text-align:center;" bgcolor="bbffbb"
| 140 || September 9 || Rangers || 6–0 || Shields (14–8) || Oswalt (4–3) ||  || 20,522 || 77–63 || 
|- style="text-align:center;" bgcolor="ffbbbb"
| 141 || September 11 || @ Orioles || 2–9 || Johnson (3–0) || Moore (10–10) || || 23,828 || 77–64 || 
|- style="text-align:center;" bgcolor="ffbbbb"
| 142 || September 12 || @ Orioles || 2–3 || Johnson (2–1) || Farnsworth (1–5) || || 26,076 || 77–65 || 
|- style="text-align:center;" bgcolor="ffbbbb"
| 143 || September 13 || @ Orioles || 2–3 (14) || Wolf (5–10) || Archer (0–3) || || 25,130 || 77–66 || 
|- style="text-align:center;" bgcolor="bbffbb"
| 144 || September 14 || @ Yankees || 6–4 || Price (18–5) || Sabathia (13–6) || Rodney (43) || 45,200 || 78–66 || 
|- style="text-align:center;" bgcolor="ffbbbb"
| 145 || September 15 || @ Yankees || 3–5 || Nova (12–7) || Shields (14–9) || Soriano (39) || 46,856 || 78–67 || 
|- style="text-align:center;" bgcolor="ffbbbb"
| 146 || September 16 || @ Yankees || 4–6 || Kuroda (14–10) || Moore (10–11) || Soriano (40) || 43,489 || 78–68 || 
|- style="text-align:center;" bgcolor="ffbbbb"
| 147 || September 17 || Red Sox || 2–5 || Cook (4–10) || Cobb (9–9) || || 11,722 || 78–69 || 
|- style="text-align:center;" bgcolor="ffbbbb"
| 148 || September 18 || Red Sox || 5–7 || Doubront (11–9) || Farnsworth (1–6) || Bailey (5) || 11,502 || 78–70 || 
|- style="text-align:center;" bgcolor="bbffbb"
| 149 || September 19 || Red Sox || 13–3 || Archer (1–3) || Matsuzaka (1–6) || || 12,708 || 79–70 || 
|- style="text-align:center;" bgcolor="bbffbb"
| 150 || September 20 || Red Sox || 7–4 || Badenhop (2–2) || Bailey (1–1) ||  || 12,963 || 80–70 || 
|- style="text-align:center;" bgcolor="bbffbb"
| 151 || September 21 || Blue Jays || 12–1 || Shields (15–9) || Villanueva (7–6) ||  || 14,187 || 81–70 || 
|- style="text-align:center;" bgcolor="bbffbb"
| 152 || September 22 || Blue Jays || 11–5 || Badenhop (3–2) || Morrow (8–7) ||  || 15,699 || 82–70 || 
|- style="text-align:center;" bgcolor="bbffbb"
| 153 || September 23 || Blue Jays || 3–0 || Hellickson (9–10) || Jenkins (0–2) || Rodney (44) || 18,985 || 83–70 || 
|- style="text-align:center;" bgcolor="bbffbb"
| 154 || September 25 || @ Red Sox || 5–2 || Price (19–5) || Buchholz (11–7) ||  || 37,045 || 84–70 || 
|- style="text-align:center;" bgcolor="bbffbb"
| 155 || September 26 || @ Red Sox || 4–2 || Cobb (10–9) || Lester (9–14) || Rodney (45) || 37,247 || 85–70 || 
|- style="text-align:center;" bgcolor="bbffbb"
| 156 || September 27 || @ White Sox || 3–2 || Peralta (2–6) || Myers (3–8) || Rodney (46) || 18,630 || 86–70 || 
|- style="text-align:center;" bgcolor="ffbbbb"
| 157 || September 28 || @ White Sox || 1–3 || Floyd (11–11) || Hellickson (9–11) || Reed (29) || 25,264 || 86–71 || 
|- style="text-align:center;" bgcolor="bbffbb"
| 158 || September 29 || @ White Sox || 10–4 || Moore (11–11) || Sale (17–8) ||  || 26,559 || 87–71 || 
|- style="text-align:center;" bgcolor="bbffbb"
| 159 || September 30 || @ White Sox || 6–2 || Price (20–5) || Quintana (6–6) ||  || 26,831 || 88–71 || 
|- style="text-align:center;" bgcolor="bbffbb"
| 160 || October 1 || Orioles || 5–3 || Cobb (11–9) || Chen (12–11) || Rodney (47) || 13,666 || 89–71 || 
|- style="text-align:center;" bgcolor="ffbbbb"
| 161 || October 2 || Orioles || 0–1 || González (9–4) || Shields (15–10) || Johnson (51) || 13,460 || 89–72 || 
|- style="text-align:center;" bgcolor="bbffbb"
| 162 || October 3 || Orioles || 4–1 || Hellickson (10–11) || Tillman (9–3) || Rodney (48) || 17,909 || 90–72 || 
|-

Roster

Batting
Note: G = Games played; AB = At bats; R = Runs scored; H = Hits; 2B = Doubles; 3B = Triples; HR = Home runs; RBI = Runs batted in; AVG = Batting average; SB = Stolen bases

Pitching
Note: W = Wins; L = Losses; ERA = Earned run average; G = Games pitched; GS = Games started; SV = Saves; IP = Innings pitched; H = Hits allowed; R = Runs allowed; ER = Earned runs allowed; BB = Walks allowed; K = Strikeouts

Farm system

LEAGUE CHAMPIONS: Hudson Valley

References

External links
2012 Tampa Bay Rays season Official Site
2012 Tampa Bay Rays season at ESPN
2012 Tampa Bay Rays season schedule at Baseball Reference
2012 Tampa Bay Rays season statistics at Baseball Reference

Tampa Bay Rays seasons
Tampa Bay
Tampa Bay RAys